Poerua River is a river in Westland District in the West Coast region of New Zealand's South Island. It flows from its headwaters in the Southern Alps to the Tasman Sea near Harihari.  The river is a trout and salmon fishing location and its mouth is where it is met by the Hinatua River and is located roughly a kilometre south of the Wanganui River's mouth. On the morning of 6 October 1999, a landslide from Mount Adams blocked the Poerua River, creating a landslide dam about 11 km upstream from the  bridge over the river.  Despite fears of flooding and other damage, there were relatively minimal impacts when the dam was breached six days later, though significant quantities of coarse gravel were deposited downstream and the river's course was changed in places.

External links 
GeoNet - page contains an image of the landslide dam across the southern Poerua River
Natural Hazards Centre - Mt Adams landslide: lessons on preparing for large earthquakes
Report on the 6 October 1999 landslide and its effects

Westland District
Rivers of the West Coast, New Zealand
Rivers of New Zealand